

Cornelius (Cornel) Lanczos (born as Kornél Lőwy, until 1906: Löwy (Lőwy) Kornél; February 2, 1893 – June 25, 1974) was a Hungarian-American and later Hungarian-Irish mathematician and physicist. According to György Marx he was one of The Martians.

Biography
He was born in Fehérvár (Alba Regia), Fejér County, Kingdom of Hungary to Károly Lőwy and Adél Hahn. Lanczos' Ph.D. thesis (1921) was on relativity theory. He sent his thesis copy to Albert Einstein, and Einstein wrote back, saying: 
"I studied your paper as far as my present overload allowed. I believe I may say this much: this does involve competent and original brainwork, on the basis of which a doctorate should be obtainable ... I gladly accept the honorable dedication."

In 1924 he discovered an exact solution of the Einstein field equation representing a cylindrically symmetric rigidly rotating configuration of dust particles. This was later rediscovered by Willem Jacob van Stockum and is known today as the van Stockum dust. It is one of the simplest known exact solutions in general relativity and is regarded as an important example, in part because it exhibits closed timelike curves.
Lanczos served as assistant to Albert Einstein during the period of 1928–29.

In 1927 Lanczos married Maria Rupp. He was offered a one-year visiting professorship from Purdue University. For a dozen years (1927–39) Lanczos split his life between two continents. His wife Maria Rupp stayed with Lanczos' parents in Székesfehérvár year-around while Lanczos went to Purdue for half the year, teaching graduate students matrix mechanics and tensor analysis. In 1933 his son Elmar was born; Elmar came to Lafayette, Indiana with his father in August 1939, just before WW II broke out. Maria was too ill to travel and died several weeks later from tuberculosis. When the Nazis purged Hungary of Jews in 1944, of Lanczos' family, only his sister and a nephew survived. Elmar married, moved to Seattle and raised two sons.  When Elmar looked at his own firstborn son, he said: "For me, it proves that Hitler did not win."

During the McCarthy era, Lanczos came under suspicion for possible communist links. In 1952, he left the U.S. and moved to the School of Theoretical Physics at the Dublin Institute for Advanced Studies in Ireland, where he succeeded Erwin Schrödinger and stayed until his death in 1974.

In 1956 Lanczos published Applied Analysis. The topics covered include "algebraic equations, matrices and eigenvalue problems, large scale linear systems, harmonic analysis, data analysis, quadrature and power expansions...illustrated by numerical examples worked out in detail." The contents of the book are stylized "parexic analysis lies between classical analysis and numerical analysis: it is roughly the theory of approximation by finite (or truncated infinite) algorithms."

Research

Lanczos did pioneering work along with G. C. Danielson on what is now called the fast Fourier transform (FFT, 1940), but the significance of his discovery was not appreciated at the time, and today the FFT is credited to Cooley and Tukey (1965). (As a matter of fact, similar claims can be made for several other mathematicians, including Carl Friedrich Gauss.). Lanczos was the one who introduced Chebyshev polynomials to numerical computing. He discovered the diagonalizable matrix.

Working in Washington DC at the U.S. National Bureau of Standards after 1949, Lanczos developed a number of techniques for mathematical calculations using digital computers, including:
 the Lanczos algorithm for finding eigenvalues of large symmetric matrices,
 the Lanczos approximation for the gamma function,
 the conjugate gradient method for solving systems of linear equations.

In 1962, Lanczos showed that the Weyl tensor, which plays a fundamental role in general relativity, can be obtained from a tensor potential that is now called the Lanczos potential.

Lanczos resampling is based on a windowed sinc function as a practical upsampling filter approximating the ideal sinc function. Lanczos resampling is widely used in video up-sampling for digital zoom applications and image scaling.

Books such as The Variational Principles of Mechanics (1949) is a classic graduate text on mechanics. He shows his explanatory ability and enthusiasm as a physics teacher: in the preface of the first edition he says it is taught for a two-semester graduate course of three hours weekly.

Publications

Books
 1949: The Variational Principles of Mechanics (dedicated to Albert Einstein), University of Toronto Press , followed by 1962, 1966, 1970 editions. 
 1956: Applied Analysis, Prentice Hall
 1961: Linear Differential Operators, Van Nostrand Company, 
 (1962: The Variational Principles of Mechanics, 2nd ed.)
 (1966: The Variational Principles of Mechanics, 3rd ed.)
 1966: Albert Einstein and the cosmic world order: six lectures delivered at the University of Michigan in the Spring of 1962, Interscience Publishers
 1966: Discourse on Fourier Series, Oliver & Boyd
 1968: Numbers without End, Edinburgh: Oliver & Boyd
 (1970: The Variational Principles of Mechanics, 4th ed.)
 1970: Judaism and Science, Leeds University Press  (22 pages, S. Brodetsky Memorial Lecture)
 1970: Space through the Ages (the Evolution of the geometric Ideas from Pythagoras to Hilbert and Einstein), Academic Press , Review by Max Jammer on Science Magazine, December 11, 1970.
 1974: The Einstein Decade (1905 — 1915), Granada Publishing 
1998: (William R. Davis, editor) Cornelius Lanczos: Collected Published Papers with Commentaries, North Carolina State University

Articles
 
 1949: "An iteration method for the solution of the eigenvalue problem of linear differential and integral operators" Journal of Research of the National Bureau of Standards, Journal of Research of the National Bureau of Standards, Research Paper 2133. Vol. 45, No. 4, October 1950. Los Angeles, September, 1949.

See also
The Martians (scientists)

References

External links 
 
 
 Cornelius Lanczos, Collected published papers with commentaries, published by North Carolina State University
 Photo gallery of Lanczos by Nicholas Higham
 Series of historic video tapes produced in 1972, digitalized on the occasion of the 120th anniversary of Cornelius Lanczos's birth

1893 births
1974 deaths
People from Székesfehérvár
Hungarian Jews
Hungarian emigrants to the United States
20th-century Hungarian mathematicians
American expatriates in the Republic of Ireland
20th-century Hungarian physicists
Irish mathematicians
Numerical analysts
Relativity theorists
Jewish physicists
Austro-Hungarian mathematicians
Academics of the Dublin Institute for Advanced Studies
Fellows of the American Physical Society